Jhirk also spelled as Jerruck is a small town on the right bank of River Indus, in district Thatta, province of Sindh, Pakistan.

History 
In the 19th century, Jhirk was the busiest river port and centre of commercial activity in Sindh. It also served as the headquarters of the Indus flotilla, the most modern navigational system of those days.

Karachi Port near Karachi was connected to Jhirk. The headquarters of the Indus flotilla was in Jhirk, near Kotri and then it went to Mithankot Rajanpur district near Dera Ghazi Khan and then to the last point Makhad Attock. This part of Indus flotilla was called Punjab flotilla and the Indus flotilla Interchangeably.  The British Indus flotilla of steamboats which once plied the Indus river is described by (Shaw 1998).

Hassan Ali Effendi the famous educationist who was instrumental in establishing Sindh Madrasatul Islam used to Work at Indus flotilla in his early years while learning English. Quaid-i-Azam Mohammed Ali Jinnah was one of his students at Sindh Madrasatul Islam Karachi.

The river Indus was an important artery of communication between Karachi and Jhirk near Kotri Sindh, was an important river port, the Indus flotilla used large quantities of firewood and it was kept to fuel steamboats. Hassan Ali Effendi kept account of the incoming and outgoing wood and Steamboats.

It was because of the commercial importance of the town that the Aga Khan the first or Awal in Urdu/ Persian, constructed his palace over there. Another testimony to the importance of Jhirk is that one of the oldest British era schools in Sindh, 15 years older than Karachi's  Sindh Madrasatul Islam, was also established in Jhirk, and is still functioning there.

This historical village is situated on the National Highway from Hyderabad to Thatta at 50 km, which near Keenjhar Lake 26 km ahead. It is on the right bank of River Indus 400 feet above the sea level on the little mountains. During British rule, it was an important place for the English rulers to reside. The English Capt April Spy of British crown in 1800s especially describes the majesty and weather of the city. He was stationed here from 1832 to 1839 writes that this was a great city consisting of a Bazaar of 200 shops and goods were available here at cheaper prices than Karachi.

Aga Khan I migrated from Iran to Afghanistan Hirat, after the First Afghan War of 1839, when British were in Hirat. After British defeat at hands of Amir Akbar son of Amir Dost Mohammed of Afghanistan. He then settled himself in Jhirk in Sindh in 1843 under British protection.

Aga Khan I built his Mahal (Palace) which still exists in the same good condition. He and his followers which were at least one thousand strong and with their residences there in Jhirk. The British were there too to protect him.

Sir Charles Napier initially made Jhirk the headquarters for the British Army in Sindh when he came to Sindh which was part of Bombay at that time.

The Grandfather of Quaid-e-Azam Muhammad Ali Jinnah, who came to visit Jhirk for his Aga Khan I Hassan Ali Shah Imam’s Deedar settled here for the rest of his life and is buried there too and his grave can be found there.

His eldest son, Jinnahbhai Poonja, father of Mohammed Ali Jinnah, was married to Sheeren Bai, the daughter of Moosa Jumo in 1874, who had also migrated along with the Agha Khan.

Some believe that Muhammad Ali Jinnah was born in Jhirk, "but most historians and biographers go along with the official line". This is however important that a Maternity Home built by Agha Khan community was described by the Archaeology Department as the proper birthplace of Quaid e Azam and a blue plate remained fixed on the same with such information by the Department for over 2 decades after partition.

He was admitted in the primary school of the town established in 1870. The school's General Register is missing. Before this controversy when the announcement of his Birth Place was made in the teaching course taught in Pakistan until 1962. It was written as Jhirk in the 8th lesson of the course until 1962 in the Books from primary to Graduation level and remained in all level of books up to the tenure of  Prime Minister of Pakistan Zulfiqar Ali Bhutto 1976.

Then it was changed to Wazir Mansion (Karachi) near Light House Karachi as Quaid-i- Azam Birth Place and a Fresh controversy arose again about birthplace of Quaid e Azam and a change was made during Gen Zia Government, it was again admitted in the books that Karachi was birth Place of Quaid-e-Azam.

A Buddha Stupa on the other side of river Indus indicates the historical position of the city. Despite having a brilliant past, Jhirk's present situation is very critical. Very little income sources exist in this city. People are dependent on special Aid and Grants from the government.

Since the majority of the population is living below the poverty Line as a result of the lack of water in Kotri, river, Jhirk town has been deserted by people. All sources of fishing and farming are depleted.

Many Graduates and Higher Secondary Pass-out youth from the Mallah Fishermen community pass their life selling brambles or on meager rural income resources.

References

Populated places in Thatta District